The 1938/1939 Daily Mail Gold Cup was a professional snooker tournament sponsored by the Daily Mail. The cup was won by Alec Brown with Sidney Smith finishing in second place in the final table. It was the fifth Daily Mail Gold Cup tournament, although only the third as a snooker event. The Daily Mail Gold Cup ran from 1935 to 1940.

Format
The 1938/1939 event was a round-robin snooker tournament and was played from 10 October 1938 to 21 January 1939. Most of the matches were played at Thurston's Hall in London. There were 6 competitors and a total of 15 matches. As previously, each match was of 71 frames and lasted six days. The 6 competitors were the same as in the 1937/38 event without Melbourne Inman. The handicap system was revised, each match having a separate handicap.

Joe Davis gave Horace Lindrum 20, Sidney Smith 30, Willie Smith 25, Alec Brown 35 and Tom Newman 40. Horace Lindrum gave Sidney Smith 7, Willie Smith 14, Alec Brown 21 and Tom Newman 30. Sidney Smith gave Willie Smith and Alec Brown 7 and Tom Newman 14. Willie Smith and Alec Brown gave Tom Newman 7. Willie Smith and Alec Brown played level.

Results
Joe Davis was given a harsher handicap than previously. He won his first two matches but then lost heavily to Sidney Smith (giving 30 point per frame) and Alec Brown (giving 35). Giving 20 points per frame, he lost the final match of the tournament against Horace Lindrum. Davis led 35–33 but lost the last three to lose the match by the odd frame.

On 14 November, in frame 4 of the match between Tom Newman and Alec Brown there was a "peculiar incident". Brown had potted a red and was between the pack and the black. Rather than play a shot with the long rest, bridging over the pack, Brown took a "cue" from his pocket. It was made of ebony and was about the size of a pencil. He chalked it and played a shot onto the black. After some discussion the referee, Charlie Chambers, called a "foul" explaining that, according to the rules, "a stroke must be made with the tip of the cue" and "a pen is not a cue" even if it had a cue-tip on the end. Brown won the frame 78–41, the afternoon session ending at 3 frames each.

During the tournament Joe Davis scored a new official record break of 138, beating the previous record of 137. It happened in his match against Alec Brown on 9 December. Davis was conceding 35 points to Brown in this match. Brown made only two visits to the table before Davis made the total clearance which included the 15 reds with 11 blacks, a pink, two blues, a green and then all the colours. The clearance was in frame 53 of the match, the fifth of the afternoon session.

Table

The positions were determined firstly by the number of matches won (MW) and, in the event of a tie, the number of frames won (FW).

References

1938-1939
1938 in snooker
1939 in snooker
1938 in English sport
1939 in English sport
1938 sports events in London
1939 sports events in London
January 1939 sports events